Imperial and Royal Majesty (abbreviated as HI&RM) was the style used by King-Emperors and their consorts as heads of imperial dynasties that were simultaneously royal. The style was notably used by the Emperor of Austria (who was also the King of Hungary and Bohemia) and by the German Emperor (who was also the King of Prussia). The Austrian and Bohemian monarchies were abolished in 1918 while the vacant throne of Hungary continued to exist until the 1940s.

Examples 
 Napoleon I was also styled Imperial and Royal Majesty between 1805 and 1814 as Emperor of the French and King of Italy.
 John VI of the United Kingdom of Portugal, Brazil and Algarves was styled His Imperial and Royal Majesty, from 1825, when Portugal and Brazil signed the Treaty of Rio de Janeiro, recognizing the Brazilian independence but granting John VI as the titular Emperor of Brazil, until 1826, when he died.
 Franz Joseph I of Austria was further titled "His Imperial and Royal Apostolic Majesty" (Seine Kaiserliche und Königliche Apostolische Majestät) along with his consort Empress Elisabeth, who was styled "Her Imperial and Royal Apostolic Majesty" (Ihre Kaiserliche und Königliche Apostolische Majestät). The plural for the couple was also used as "Their Imperial and Royal Apostolic Majesties" (Ihre Kaiserlichen und Königlichen Apostolischen Majestäten).
 Queen Victoria of the United Kingdom reigned as Queen-Empress of India between 1876 and 1901. Her successors, King Edward VII, King George V, King Edward VIII and King George VI reigned as King-Emperors (1901–47).  However, these monarchs did not use the style Imperial and Royal Majesty, preferring the style His/Her Majesty instead.
 Victor Emmanuel III of Italy claimed the thrones of Ethiopia and Albania as Emperor of Ethiopia (1936–41) and King of the Albanians (1939–43). 
 The last king-emperor to use that style was Mohammad Reza Shah Pahlavi, the Shah of Iran (r: 1941–79).

Note
 Although being known as the King-Emperor, Peter I of Brazil was not styled His Imperial and Royal Majesty, neither His Imperial and Royal Highness, when his father, John VI, died, in 1826. His condition as Emperor of Brazil was not compatible with his title as King of Portugal, neither in Brazil nor in Portugal, and when he was confirmed King by the Portuguese Courts, in 1834, being entitled Peter IV of Portugal, he had already abdicated the Brazilian throne in favor of his son, Pedro of Alcântara, Prince Imperial of Brazil.

See also 
Imperial and Royal Highness

Royal styles